Okilani Tinilau (born 2 January 1989) is a Tuvaluan footballer and sprinter who represented Tuvalu at the 2008 Summer Olympics. As a footballer, Tinilau plays for F.C. Manu Laeva in the Tuvalu A-Division, also playing on the Tuvalu national football team.

Football

Club career
He plays for FC Manu Laeva football club in Tuvalu. At the 2012 NBT Cup he was the top scorer with 5 goals.

He represented Tuvalu at the 2008 Summer Olympics in Beijing, during the country's first ever Olympic Games. While competing in the 100 metre sprint, he set a national record with a time of 11.48. His personal best time is 11.44.

Tinilau also participated in the 2009 World Championships in Athletics, (11.57 sec) the 2011 World Championships (11.58 secs) and the 2013 World Championships (11.57 secs).

His personal best in the long jump is 6.52 m.

International career
Tinilau is also part of the Tuvalu national football team as a midfielder and participated in the 2011 Pacific Games. He made his debut in the match against New Caledonia on 1 September 2011. He also played in the games against Vanuatu; and the Solomon Islands.

Honours 

NBT Cup Top Scorer: 2012
Christmas Cup Top Scorer: 2012

Athletics

Track events

Field events

References

External links
 

1989 births
Athletes (track and field) at the 2008 Summer Olympics
Living people
Olympic athletes of Tuvalu
Tuvaluan footballers
Tuvalu international footballers
People from Nukulaelae
Association football midfielders
Tuvaluan male sprinters
World Athletics Championships athletes for Tuvalu
F.C. Manu Laeva players